Alexey Vasilyevich Tokarev (born 25 January 1973) is a Russian windsurfer, who specialized in the RS:X class. He represented his country Russia at the 2008 Summer Olympics, finishing outside the top thirty from a fleet of 35 registered windsurfers. Tokarev is also a member of the Russian Sailing Federation.

Tokarev competed for the Russian sailing squad, as a 35-year-old, in the inaugural men's RS:X class at the 2008 Summer Olympics in Beijing. He topped the selection criteria against five other windsurfers for the country's RS:X berth, based on his scores attained in a series of international regattas approved by the Russian Sailing Federation, including the class-associated Worlds seven months earlier in Auckland, New Zealand. Sitting most of the races at the sterns of a large fleet, Tokarev accumulated a net score of 279 points to finish his run in the penultimate position out of 35 entrants. Furthermore, Tokarev's overall score spared him from the bottom of the leaderboard by a desirable 14-point edge over Colombia's Santiago Grillo.

References

External links
 
 
 
 

1973 births
Living people
Russian male sailors (sport)
Russian windsurfers
Olympic sailors of Russia
Sailors at the 2008 Summer Olympics – RS:X
Sportspeople from Irkutsk